Juan Sebastián Palma Micolta (born 18 July 1999) is a Colombian footballer who currently plays as a defender for Charleston Battery in the USL Championship.

On 27 December 2022, Palma signed with Charleston Battery in the USL Championship, the American second division.

Career statistics

Club

Notes

Honours
Colombia U-21
 Central American and Caribbean Games: 2018

References

1999 births
Living people
Colombian footballers
Association football defenders
Once Caldas footballers
Categoría Primera A players
Colombia under-20 international footballers
Charleston Battery players
Colombian expatriate footballers
Colombian expatriate sportspeople in the United States
Expatriate soccer players in the United States